The 1959 Gent–Wevelgem was the 21st edition of the Gent–Wevelgem cycle race and was held on 4 April 1959. The race started in Ghent and finished in Wevelgem. The race was won by Leon Vandaele.

General classification

References

Gent–Wevelgem
1959 in road cycling
1959 in Belgian sport
April 1959 sports events in Europe